Alida Withoos (c. 1661/62 – 5 December 1730 (buried)) was a Dutch botanical artist and painter. She was the daughter of the painter Matthias Withoos.

Life
Alida Withoos was born in Amersfoort. With three brothers Johannes, Pieter, Frans, and her sister Maria, she was trained by her father in painting still lifes and botanical illustrations. Because of the invasion of Utrecht by the French, the family moved to Hoorn in 1672. In 1701, Alida married the Fijnschilder Andries Cornelisz van Dalen, a typical example of relations between artistic and painterly families in seventeenth and eighteenth century Holland.

A training in painting was expensive and not often given to daughters, but talented daughters could be trained to work in the studio of their father, uncle, brother or spouse, often under his name. Unlike her husband, brothers and sister, Alida acquired a certain reputation painting under her own name, principally due to her botanical images. In Hoorn a number of the Withoos children were active as artists of flowers, birds, butterflies and insects. In inventories, such images were regularly called "Withoosjes".

Alida was – with her brother Pieter – one of the many artists who painted plants on the country house place Vijverhof in the service of Agnes Block. She painted in 1687 (at Agnes Block's) the first pineapple bred in Europe, though these images have unfortunately not survived. Thirteen water colours that Alida made in 1694 for the coloured Moninckx Atlas, along with 425 images of plants in the Hortus Botanicus in Amsterdam (where plants brought back in the ships of the Dutch East India Company were grown in neat rows as at Block's house), have survived. The Library of Wageningen University own a book of drawings bought by the collector Simon Schijnvoet that includes 7 by Alida Withoos, perhaps made for Block. These give a good idea of the high quality of her work.

She was buried in the Western Church in Amsterdam.

References

External links

 Biography in Digitaal Vrouwenlexicon
 Alida Withoos and her work – Digital exhibitions of Bibliotheek Wageningen UR
 Konstboeck

1660s births
1730 deaths
Dutch Golden Age painters
People from Amersfoort
Dutch women painters
Flower artists
17th-century women artists